The Harlingen–Nieuweschans railway is a railway line in the Netherlands running from the port of Harlingen to Bad Nieuweschans, passing through Leeuwarden and Groningen. The line was opened between 1863 and 1868. It is also known as the Staatslijn "B". At Bad Nieuweschans, a connection with the German railway network is provided through the Ihrhove–Nieuweschans railway.

History 
The Frisian Port of Harlingen was meant to be a segment in an international transport-chain between Great Britain and Eurasia. Already in 1845 some Belgian engineers Xavier Tarte and Castillion Du Portail projected and developed a Pan-European Railwayjunction between Spain via Paris, Wallonië Maastricht- Arnhem- Zwolle onto Harlingen via Leeuwarden, and from Harlingen via Leeuwarden, Groningen and the German border, Nieuweschans onto the Northern German ports Bremen-Hamburg.

It was not until the 1860s before a part of this plan could be completed by the former Dutch government, the administration of mister Thorbecke and the Law to reorganise the statal debts, mr Van Hall. This administration committed the railway-constructions all over the Netherlands outside the so-called pre-occupied presumen 'Economical heart' the 'Randstad-Holland' including the political advanted main-seaports Rotterdam and above all, Seaport Amsterdam-IJmound. 
Benearth the junction (vlissingen-port)-Breda- Tilburg, With the railway junction Harlingen-Leeuwarden (1863) and Leeuwarden - Leer Germany (1867) Harlingen was the very first harbour that by Administration of the Dutch government directly had been connected with the European hinterland.

Although Harlingen-port was advanced in connecting seaways at the time (until the 1850s) Harlingen did not have any changes to develop its Port and direct Railway connection with Northern Europe, Russia Scandinavia and Baltic States.
Moreover, by this time, Harlingen Port must take her opportunity, to get better connected by Railway because of the Law 'Natura-2000' and 'Geomorfological regulations seabed biothope'. The present administration of the ministry of Infrastructure and Environment (I&M) refuses any co-operation in developing Port Harlingen as a partner-port of Randstad ARA-Mainports.

Stations

The main interchange stations on the Harlingen–Nieuweschans railway are:
Leeuwarden: to Utrecht, Zwolle, and Stavoren
Groningen: to Utrecht, Zwolle, Delfzijl and Roodeschool
Zuidbroek: to Veendam
Bad Nieuweschans: to Leer (Germany)

All stations and stops on the railway are:

 Harlingen Haven (1863–present)
 Harlingen (1863–present)
 Franeker (1863–present)
 Dronrijp (1863–present)
 Deinum (1863–present)
 Leeuwarden (1863–present)
 Leeuwarden Achter de Hoven (1915–2018)
 Leeuwarden Camminghaburen (1991–present)
 Ouddeel (1915–1947)
 Tietjerk (1866–1950)
 Hurdegaryp (1866–present)
 Veenwouden (1866–present)
 Zwaagwesteinde (1885–present)
 Wildpad (1885–1887)
 Veenklooster-Twijzel (1921–1938)
 Buitenpost (1866–present)
 Visvliet (1892–1991)
 Grijpskerk (1866–present)
 Zuidhorn (1866–present)
 Den Horn (1885–1938)
 Hoogkerk-Vierverlaten (1866–1951)
 Groningen (1866–present)
 Groningen Europapark (2007–present)
 Westerbroek (1905–1932)
 Kropswolde (1868–present)
 Martenshoek (1868–present)
 Hoogezand-Sappemeer (1868–present)
 Sappemeer Oost (1887–2020)
 Scholte (1933–1935)
 Zuidbroek (1868–present)
 Scheemda (1868–present)
 Heiligerlee (1908–1934)
 Winschoten (1868–present)
 Ulsda (1887–1938)
 Bad Nieuweschans (1868–present)

References

External links 
 

1860s establishments in the Netherlands
Railway lines in Friesland
Railway lines in Groningen (province)
19th-century architecture in the Netherlands